Caparica is a former civil parish in the municipality (concelho) of Almada, Lisbon Metropolitan Area, Portugal.

See also
 Charneca de Caparica
 Costa de Caparica